The 25th Directors Guild of America Awards, honoring the outstanding directorial achievements in film and television in 1972, were presented in 1973.

Winners and nominees

Film

Television

Outstanding Television Director
 Lamont Johnson

D.W. Griffith Award
 David Lean
 William A. Wellman

Honorary Life Member
 David Lean

External links
 

Directors Guild of America Awards
1972 film awards
1972 television awards
Direct
Direct
Directors